Viña (vineyard in Spanish and Galician) or La Viña may refer to:

Places 
 La Viña Department, Salta, Argentina
 La Viña, Salta, a village and rural municipality
 La Viña, Catamarca, Argentina, a village and municipality
 La Viña Canton, Bolivia
 La Viña Airport, Coquimbo Region, Chile

People 
 Antonio La Viña (born 1959), Filipino lawyer and academic
 Fernando Viña (born 1969), American former Major League Baseball player and analyst
 Josephine de la Viña (1946–2011), Filipino discus thrower
 Matías Viña (born 1997), Uruguayan footballer
 Viña Delmar (1903–1990), American playwright

See also
Vina (disambiguation)
Veena